LNV Ligue A may refer to:

 LNV Ligue A Masculine, the top division of men's volleyball in France, governed by Ligue Nationale de Volley
 LNV Ligue A Féminine, the top division of women's volleyball in France, governed by Ligue Nationale de Volley